Dianne H.B. Welsh is the Hayes Distinguished Professor at the University of North Carolina at Greensboro. She is known for her work in establishing new programs in training entrepreneurs and developing university curricula on entrepreneurship.

Education and career 
Welsh has a B.A. from the University of Iowa (1978), an M.S. Emporia State University (1984), and a Ph.D. from the University of Nebraska–Lincoln (1988). She has worked at multiple universities including Eastern Washington University, where she was promoted to professor in 1997. From 2005 until 2008 she was the Walter Chair in Entrepreneurship at the University of Tampa, and in 2008 she was named the Hayes Distinguished Professor at the University of North Carolina at Greensboro.

Welsh is known for her work in developing university programs on entrepreneurship. To meet this objective she co-authored the fourth edition of Global Entrepreneurship and the accompanying Global Entrepreneurship Case Studies. Welsh has launched three entrepreneurship centers/programs, at John Carroll University, the University of Tampa, and the University of North Carolina Greensboro. From 2013 until 2014 she was the president of the Small Business Institute.

Selected publications

Honors and awards 
She was named a Justin Longenecker fellow of the United States' Association for Small Business & Entrepreneurship in 2011, and a fellow of the Small Business Institute in 2017. In 2018, she received the Deshpande Symposium award for Excellence in Curriculum Innovation in Entrepreneurship Award. In 2019 she received the North Carolina Board of Governor award for excellence in teaching, and the Barbara Hollander award for Lifetime Achievement from the Family Firm Institute in 2019. Welsh received the Legacy Award for Lifetime achievement from the Global Consortium of Entrepreneurship Centers in 2020.

References

External links 
 

Living people
University of Iowa alumni
Emporia State University alumni
University of Nebraska–Lincoln alumni
University of North Carolina at Greensboro faculty
Social entrepreneurship in the United States
Year of birth missing (living people)